Bartholomew F. Sullivan (1879 – February 24, 1968) was an American football and track and field coach and a marathon runner. He served as the head track coach at The College of the Holy Cross in Worcester, Massachusetts from 1912 to 1964. He was also the school's head football coach for one season in 1918, compiling a record of 2–0.

He finished seventh in the 1900 Boston Marathon.

Head coaching record

Football

References

External links
 

1879 births
1968 deaths
American male marathon runners
Holy Cross Crusaders football coaches
Holy Cross Crusaders track and field coaches
Sportspeople from New Brunswick
Canadian emigrants to the United States